Palais des Sports (English: Palace of Sports) is an indoor sports complex in the city of Orléans, France. The capacity of the arena is 3,222 people. It is one of two arenas used by the French Pro A League professional basketball team Entente Orléanaise. The Palais des Sports, with its smaller capacity, hosts the team's domestic competitions, while EuroLeague and Eurocup matches are held in the larger Zénith d'Orléans.

In addition to basketball, since 2005, the arena has played host to the Open d'Orléans, a tennis tournament that is part of the ATP Challenger Tour.

References

Indoor arenas in France
Basketball venues in France
Sports venues in Loiret